Hegesippos or Latinized Hegesippus, may refer to:

 Hegesippus (orator), 4th century BC
 Hegesippus of Halicarnassus, naval commander during 306 BC campaign
 Hegesippus (chronicler), 2nd century, early Church chronicler and saint 
 Pseudo-Hegesippus, conventional title for a 4th-century adaptor of The Jewish War of Flavius Josephus